"Barabajagal" is a song by British singer/songwriter Donovan Leitch, released by Donovan in 1969. It was later used as title track to the album Barabajagal. The instrumental backing is provided by The Jeff Beck Group, with backing vocals by Lesley Duncan, Suzi Quatro and Madeline Bell.

Background
The song, along with "Trudi" and "Stromberg Twins", was recorded in May 1969 at the Olympic Studios in London. Other songs were recorded with The Jeff Beck Group but they remained unreleased until they appeared as bonus tracks on the 2005 reissue of the Barabajagal album.

The first UK pressings of the single use the full title "Goo Goo Barabajagal (Love Is Hot)" and give the B-side the title "Bed With Me". Subsequent pressings (most UK copies) shorten the title to "Barabajagal" and rename the B-side "Trudi". The title is a made-up name for a seductive lover mentioned in the song. In a later interview, Donovan explained that the song title was an invented word and had been inspired by the phrase "goo goo ga joob" from The Beatles' song "I Am the Walrus". The single is credited to Donovan and Jeff Beck Group. In the US it was always credited as "Goo Goo Barabajagal (Love Is Hot)" by Donovan with the Jeff Beck Group, and with the B-side "Trudi".

It reached No. 12 in the UK Singles Chart and No. 36 in the US chart. It was Donovan's final top 40 entry in either country.

The instrumental backing is provided by The Jeff Beck Group. In his autobiography, Donovan relates how Jeff Beck's guitar had not been delivered to the studio, so they had to borrow one for him to play on the track (at Beck's request, it was a Fender, his preferred instrument).

In 2005 the track was remastered by EMI Records for the Barabajagal album re-issue.

Personnel
Sources: 

 Donovan – guitar, vocals
 Jeff Beck – guitar
 Ronnie Wood – bass
 Madeline Bell – backing vocals
 Micky Waller – drums
 Lesley Duncan – backing vocals
 Suzi Quatro – backing vocals
 Nicky Hopkins – keyboards
 Mickie Most – producer

Legacy
In 1970 a Czech version of the song was issued, as the B-side to "Motejl Modrejl (Mellow Yellow)", by Czech singer and actor Václav Neckář on the Supraphon label.

The song was covered in 1991 by "The Love-in" on Scream Records, UK. (Scream Records were an early 90s UK hip-hop label, possibly called "From A Whisper To A Scream
").

The song was featured on the 2009 "Ronnie Chase" episode (Season 5, Episode 15) of the US television show Nip/Tuck.

In 2016, the song was featured in an international Heineken advertisement campaign starring Benicio del Toro.

References

External links

1969 singles
Donovan songs
Song recordings produced by Mickie Most
Pye Records singles
Songs written by Donovan
Epic Records singles
1969 songs